The Golden Mile (La Milla de Oro) is a term for a stretch of land that lays home to a group of wineries in the province of Valladolid, Castilla y Leon, Spain. Geographically they lay along the Duero river starting at Tudela de Duero in the west and continuing on until it reaches Peñafiel in the east along the N-122 motorway. The wineries associated include: Vega Sicilia, Pingus, Abadia Retuerta, Alión and Mauro. Among the grapes grown in the area are Tempranillo, Cabernet Sauvignon, and Syrah.

References

Wine regions of Spain
Province of Valladolid